Diogo André Simões Pedrosa Capitão Machado (born 6 March 2000) is a Portuguese professional footballer who plays as a midfielder for Benfica B.

International career
Capitão has represented Portugal at youth international level.

Career statistics

Club

Notes

References

2000 births
Living people
Footballers from Lisbon
Portuguese footballers
Portugal youth international footballers
Association football midfielders
Liga Portugal 2 players
S.L. Benfica B players